Capri or deep sky blue is a deep shade of sky blue which is between cyan and azure on the colour wheel. The colour Capri in general is named for the colour of the Mediterranean Sea around the island of Capri off Italy, the site of several villas belonging to the Roman Emperor Tiberius, including his Imperial residence in his later years, the Villa Jovis.  Specifically, the colour Capri is named after the colour of the Blue Grotto on the island of Capri, as it appears on a bright sunny day.

The first use of Capri as a colour name in English was in 1920. The normalized colour coordinates for Capri are identical to deep sky blue, which was formalized as a color in the X11 colour names over 1985–1989.

References 

Quaternary colors
Shades of blue
Shades of cyan
Capri, Campania